Remove Silence is a Brazilian hard rock band from Sao Paulo, Brazil formed in 2007. Founded by Hugo Mariutti, Fabio Ribeiro formerly of Brazilian band Shaman, Ale Souza and Edu Cominato. Remove Silence released their debut album Fade in September 2009 on the Dynamo Records label in Brazil.

History
Remove Silence is a band from Sao Paulo, Brazil, formed in 2007 by guitarist/vocalist Hugo
Mariutti (Shaman, Andre Matos), keyboardist Fabio Ribeiro (Angra, Shaman, Andre Matos), bassist/vocalist Ale Souza, and drummer/vocalist Edu Cominato. The band's debut album, Fade, was released in September 2009, via Dynamo Records in Brazil. The album features 10 original songs, plus a new version of Jeff Buckley’s “Dream Brother”. Recently the band signed the contract for the release of Fade in North America with Dallas, Texas based Metaledge Records. Fade will be released to North America on September 21, 2010, in the digital format and in stores. The title track Fade has been featured in rotation on MTV Brazil since December 2009. In 2010, the band launched their new website and a video series on YouTube.

Band members

Current members
Danilo Carpigiani - Guitars/Vocals
Fabio Ribeiro - Keyboards
Ale Souza - Bass/Vocals
Leo Baeta - Drums

Past members
Hugo Mariutti - Guitars/Vocals (2007-2014)
Edu Cominato - Drums/Vocals (2007-2014)

Discography
Studio albums

References

Sources

External links
Official Website

Brazilian heavy metal musical groups
Musical groups established in 2007
Musical quartets
Brazilian rock music groups
2007 establishments in Brazil